The tubelip wrasse (Labrichthys unilineatus) is a species of wrasse native to the Indian Ocean and the western Pacific Ocean. It is of minor importance to local commercial fisheries and can be found in the aquarium trade. This species is the only known member of its genus.

Description
The tubelip wrasse juveniles are brown with 2 bluish white stripes along their body, as they increase in size the stripes disappear. The females are yellowish brown with faint stripes. The males have a more intense and bright colour than the females with a large yellow patch around the base of the pectoral fin. The yellow lips are thick and fleshy, creating a short tube when the mouth is closed. The head is covered in scales apart from a sheath over base of upper lip, the area in front of the eyes and the chin. The upper jaw has no teeth between the two forward pairs of canines and the large canine in the corner of each jaw.

Distribution
The tubelip wrasse has a wide Indo-Pacific distribution, it is found on the coast of East Africa in Tanzania and Mozambiique through the Indian Ocean, including the main islands into the Pacific Ocean as far as Micronesia and Samoa, north to the Ryukyus and Taiwan and south to the Great Barrier Reef and Lord Howe Island in Australia.

Habitat and ecology
The tubelip wrasse inhabits shallow lagoon reefs and semi-protected seaward reefs where there is a high level of coral cover. It is found near branching corals, especially staghorn corals of the genus Acropora, the polyps of which are the main components of its diet.

Species description and etymology
Labrichthys unilineatus was formally described in 1847 as Cossyphus unilineatus by the French naturalist Alphonse Guichenot with the type locality given as Guam. In 1854 the Dutch ichthyologist Pieter Bleeker placed C. unilineatus in the monotypic genus Labrichthys. The generic name is a combination of the Greek labrax, which can be taken to mean "voracious", and ichthys, which means "fish". The specific name unilineatus means "one lined" and refers to the lateral strip of the juveniles.

Human usage
The tubelip wrasse is of minor interest to commercial fisheries and it occasionally turns up in the aquarium trade.

References

External links
 

Labridae
Fish described in 1847
Taxa named by Alphonse Guichenot